The 32nd Signal Regiment is a national support signals regiment of the Italian Army based in Padua in Veneto and Turin in Piedmont. The unit was formed in 1953 as an operational signal battalion and assigned to the Signal Command of the Command designated "3rd Army". In 1972 the Command designated "3rd Army" was disbanded and the battalion was assigned to the V Territorial Military Command. In 1975 the battalion was transferred to the 5th Army Corps and named for the Valles Pass. The same year the battalion also received its own flag. In 1992 the battalion was reorganized as a national support signal battalion and took over the personnel and tasks of the disbanded 42nd Signal Battalion "Pordoi". The same year the battalion entered the newly formed 32nd Signal Regiment. In 1998 the regiment received the Battalion "Frejus" from the disbanded 41st Signal Regiment. Today the regiment is assigned to the army's Signal Command and operates and maintains the army's signal network in Northern Italy.

History 
On 20 June 1953 the XXXII Army Signal Operations Battalion was formed in Padua. The battalion was assigned to the Command designated "3rd Army" and consisted of a command, a command company, a radio operations company, a phone line operations company, a line construction company, and a mixed company. On 15 January 1954 the battalion was renamed XXXII Army Signal Battalion.

On 31 December 1969 the battalion was split to form two new battalions the next day: the XXXI Army Signal Battalion (Operations), which received the radio operations company and phone line operations company, and the XXXII Army Signal Battalion (Mixed), which received the line construction company and the mixed company. The command company of the original battalion was split to form two command and services platoons, one for each of the two new battalions.

After 1 January 1970 the XXXII Army Signal Battalion (Mixed) consisted of a command, a command and services platoon, 1st Operations Company (Reserve), 2nd Radio Relay Company, 3rd Line Construction Company, Mixed Electronic Warfare Company. The XXXI Army Signal Battalion (Operations) consisted of a command, a command and services platoon, 1st Signal Center Company, 2nd Signal Center Company (Reserve), 3rd Radio Operations Company. In case of war with Yugoslavia the two battalions would have entered the 3rd Army Signal Regiment, which would have been formed upon the beginning of hostilities by the 3rd Army's Signal Command.

On 31 August 1970 the Mixed Electronic Warfare Company left the battalion and the next day it became an autonomous unit. On 5 February 1975 the company was elevated to XXXIII Electronic Warfare Battalion. On 31 March 1972 the Command designated "3rd Army" and the XXXI Army Signal Battalion (Operations) were disbanded. The next day the XXXII Army Signal Battalion (Mixed) was renamed XXXII Signal Battalion and assigned to the V Territorial Military Command. The battalion consisted now of a command, a command and services platoon, and three signal companies.

During the 1975 army reform the army disbanded the regimental level and newly independent battalions were granted for the first time their own flags. During the reform signal battalions were renamed for mountain passes. On 15 October 1975 the XXXII Signal Battalion was renamed 32nd Signal Battalion "Valles". On 12 November 1976 the battalion was granted a flag by decree 846 of the President of the Italian Republic Giovanni Leone.

The battalion consisted now of a command and services platoon, the 1st Operations Company, and the 2nd and 3rd radio relay companies.

On 18 February 1992 the battalion received the personnel and materiel of the disbanded 42nd Signal Battalion "Pordoi" and became a national support signal unit. On 12 September 1992 the 32nd Signal Battalion "Valles" lost its autonomy and the next day the battalion entered the newly formed 32nd Signal Regiment as Battalion "Valles". On the same date the flag of the 32nd Signal Battalion "Valles" was transferred from the battalion to the 32nd Signal Regiment.

On 19 May 1998 the regiment joined the army's C4 IEW Command. On 1 October 1998 the regiment received the Battalion "Frejus" from the disbanded 41st Signal Regiment in Turin.

Current structure 
As of 2023 the 32nd Signal Regiment consists of:

  Regimental Command, in Padua
 Command and Logistic Support Company, in Padua
  Battalion "Valles", in Padua
 1st Area Support Signal Company
 2nd C4 Support Signal Company
  Battalion "Frejus", in Turin
 Command and Logistic Support Company
 3rd Area Support Signal Company
 4th C4 Support Signal Company
 13th C4 Maintenance Unit, in Turin
 13th C4 Maintenance Unit Detachment, in Milan
 21st C4 Maintenance Unit, in Padua
 21st C4 Maintenance Unit Detachment, in Udine
 21st C4 Maintenance Unit Detachment, in Bolzano
 Computer Incident Response Team, in Padua

The Command and Logistic Support Company fields the following platoons: C3 Platoon, Transport and Materiel Platoon, Medical Platoon, and Commissariat Platoon. The Battalion "Valles" covers Veneto, Trentino-Alto Adige/Südtirol and Friuli Venezia Giulia, while the Battalion "Frejus" covers Piedmont, Aosta, Lombardy, and Liguria.

External links
Italian Army Website: 32° Reggimento Trasmissioni

References

Signal Regiments of Italy